Shershabadia, also known as Badia or Bhatia, is a Bengali Muslim community found in the state of West Bengal, Bihar and Jharkhand in India. They belong to Shaikh community and also form a significant part of the Shaikhs of West Bengal and Bihar. Common surnames used by the community include Shekh, Sekh, Haque, Islam, Mondal. Most of them are Sunni Muslims who associate with the Ahl-i Hadith movement.

These people mostly live in chars and dubas (lower land) along Gangetic river lines from Katihar district of Bihar on the north bank and Rajmahal District of Jharkhand on the south bank to Murshidabad districts of West Bengal on the South bank and Malda district of West Bengal on the north bank.

Terminology 
The word Shershabadia (from Persian: شرشابادیا) literally means (the language and/or the people) of the land known as Shershabad. The term is derived from the community's place of origin known as Jawar-e-Sarsabad or Circle/Division of Sarsabad of the Mughal era, which was reduced to a mere Pargana known as sarsabad/Sersabad later on corrupted into Shershabad/Shershahabad. Located in the Bengal region, Shershabad comprised the parts of southern Malda and northern Murshidabad.

History and origin
The Shershabadia Bengali Muslim community originated from the erstwhile Jawar-e-Sarsabad or division of Sarsabad which comprised Northern parts of Murshidabad, most parts of Malda of West bengal and the north-eastern parts of Sahebganj district of Jharkhand.

Towards the beginning of the 20th century, a large number of Shershabadia Bengali Muslims of Murshidabad (chiefly from Farakka, Samserganj and Suti police stations) gradually migrated to Malda along the upward river-stream of the Ganges to settle in the chars and diyaras due to the erosion of the west bank of the Ganges.

From Malda and Murshidabad they migrated upwards along the river-stream and scattered into the various regions of Eastern Bihar and Northern Bengal. The cause of migration is thought to be due to the oppression of British Government for their engagement in the anti-British activities and the erosion of the Ganges along the left and right banks.

They participated in the anti-British activities under the banner of Wahabi movement in the mid nineteenth century. They established  several anti-British outposts across the district of Malda and adjoining regions. Freedom fighters, funds, ammunitions etc. were collected from wide areas by boat through river ways and were gathered at first in Narayanpur centre and then forwarded to Patna centre by board and ultimately supplied systematically to Sittana, the battlefield of the North-West Frontiers. They developed systematic collections of Zakat, Osor, Fitra, and other voluntary subscriptions from these areas. They also invented a new system of collecting fund, i.e. "Mutthi".  This system was invented by the Patna Kalif for the cause of developing fund to launch anti-British Movement.

They were engaged in anti-British activities under leaders such as Maulana Rafi Mondal, Moulavi Amiruddin and Ibrahim Mondal. The leaders of the movement were prosecuted in 1869 for waging war against the British Government. Moulavi Amiruddin and Ibrahim Mondal were sentenced to the exile in the Andaman Islands in the conspiracy of malda, 1870 and conspiracy of Rajmahal, 1870 respectively.

During the British period, the Shershabadia were considered by the British authorities, to have criminal tendency for the involvement of some members in the anti-British movement known as Wahabi Movement, but later on deleted from the list of Criminal Tribes.

Geographic Distribution
The Shershabadias traditionally resides along the left and right banks of the Ganges from Rajmahal district of Jharkhand up to the Godagari sub-district of Bangladesh's Rajshahi Division. At present, they live mainly in the surrounding districts of West Bengal and Bihar namely Malda, Murshidabad, Uttar Dinajpur, Purnia, Katihar etc. Presently, after the divide of Bihar into Jharkhand, the districts of Jharkhand namely Pakur and Sahebganj are where they are found. They also live in Darjeeling and Uttar Dinajpur districts of West Bengal where they migrated from Malda and Murshidabad.

Present circumstances
The Shershabadia people reportedly speak a Bengali dialect called Badia, which is a subdialect of the Varendri dialect of Bengali language. Those who reside in Bihar and Jharkhand have knowledge of Hindi.

They are a community of settled agriculturist, but as their population has grown, the land ownership has been sub-divided. This has led to many becoming landless, and a growth of those in the community who are agricultural labour, day labour, teaching, business etc. This drift is aggravated also due to the river bank erosion along the Ganges which flows through the parts of the southern Malda and Northern Murshidabad.

The community entirely belongs to Sunni Muslim. The majority do not belong to any of the four recognized theological schools of Islam viz. Hanafi, Shafi'i, Maliki and Hanbali. Rather they follow all the correct call from all the four Imams and they are known as Ahl-i Hadith (strict followers of the Quran and Hadith). Preaching of any Pir/ Darbesh (Muslim Saint) is not accepted of them normally. Except the prayer in funeral ground they do not perform Jiyarat (a type of prayer kindling light). As a whole they are not involved in popular Muharram but some of them are remain on fasting throughout the day. Charham and Chalisha (observance on fourth and fortieth day after death) are not performed in Shershabadia Community.

Social Traditions
They live in the organised settlements of their own in a para or village. Few households from the same area forms a Jamat or Dōsh. This Jamat is responsible for managing ceremonies related to birth, marriage and death. It also settles the familial and land disputes locally. The role of Sōrdar of the Jamat (Chief of the Community) is very important in this society.

Their females follow the system of Parda (Veil) as far as practiced. Shershabadia women are experts in stitching Kantha/Kheta (clothes) and singing Badia Geed (songs).

Marriage is solemnised mostly at daytime. During marriages they perform the rituals like Haldi Makha, Bayna Kora, Geed Gaha, Thubra Khawa etc.

Their traditional food items include Kalayer uti/ruti, Ayaikhar Khir,  Pantabhat, Jalbhat, Andhasa/Adarsa, Chityai/Chitua Pitha etc.

See also
 Bengali Muslim
 Khotta Muslim

References

Social groups of Bihar
Shaikh clans
Bengali people